Sangurigadhi is a rural municipality (gaunpalika) out of four rural municipality located in Dhankuta District of Province No. 1 of Nepal. There are a total of 7 municipalities in Dhankuta in which 3 are urban and 4 are rural.

To form this new Rural Municipality Budi Morang, Khuwaphok, Phaksib, Danda Bazar, Bhedetar, Mahabharat and Ahale were merged, which previously were all separate Village development committee (local level administrative villages). Fulfilling the requirement of the new Constitution of Nepal 2015, Ministry of Federal Affairs and Local Development replaced all old VDCs and Municipalities into 753 new local level body (Municipality).

The Gaunpalika is divided into 10 wards and the Bhedetar is the Headquarter of this newly formed rural municipality.

Demographics
At the time of the 2011 Nepal census, Sangurigadhi Rural Municipality had a population of 21,537. Of these, 31.0% spoke Bantawa, 28.0% Limbu, 12.2% Nepali, 7.8% Magar, 6.7% Yakkha, 5.4% Rai, 2.9% Tamang, 1.6% Yamphu, 1.0% Chintang and 3.4% other languages as their first language.

In terms of ethnicity/caste, 39.5% were Rai, 29.2% Limbu, 8.0% Magar, 6.7% Yakkha, 3.4% Chhetri, 3.1% Tamang, 2.2% Kami, 1.6% Yamphu, 1.4% Hill Brahmin and 4.9% others.

In terms of religion, 67.2% were Kirati, 21.3% Hindu, 6.6% Buddhist, 4.7% Christian, 0.1% Prakriti and 0.1% Muslim.

References

External links
 Official website

Rural municipalities in Koshi Province
Populated places in Dhankuta District
Rural municipalities of Nepal established in 2017
Rural municipalities in Dhankuta District